Rayward Powell St. John (September 18, 1940 – August 22, 2021) was an American singer and songwriter, active on the mid-1960s Austin, Texas campus folk/bohemian music scene. He was an occasional member of various Austin rock groups, including The Conqueroo, and wrote some songs for The 13th Floor Elevators, including "You Don't Know (How Young You Are)", included on the band's 1966 debut, The Psychedelic Sounds of the 13th Floor Elevators.

Biography
Powell St. John was born in Houston, Texas on September 18, 1940. Three years later, his family moved to Laredo, Texas. He moved from Laredo to Austin, Texas in 1959 as a beatnik.

St. John began his musical career in Austin in the early 1960s, playing at parties and clubs around the University of Texas campus. Eventually, he came to work with Kenneth Threadgill of Austin's Threadgill's Bar, performing with Janis Joplin and Lannie Wiggins in a small trio called The Waller Creek Boys. Later, responding to a request for material from Tommy Hall of the 13th Floor Elevators, St. John wrote six songs for their first two albums.

In the late 1960s, St. John moved to San Francisco, California, forming the band Mother Earth with Tracy Nelson. He left the group along with some other members after the band's second album, when they relocated from California to the Nashville area.

St. John's songs have been recorded by artists including Janis Joplin ("Bye, Bye Baby"), Boz Scaggs ("I'll Forever Sing"), Mother Earth ("Living with the Animals", "The Kingdom of Heaven is Within You", "Marvel Group", "Then I'll Be Moving On", and "I, The Fly"), Roky Erickson ("Right Track Now"), Doug Sahm ("You Don’t Know"), and The Vietnam Veterans ("Right Track Now").

In 2005 the Texas Music Hall of Fame inducted Powell St. John as part of the South by Southwest Music Conference. In Spring 2006 he was reunited with Roky Erickson in performance at South By Southwest.

In 2009, he released his second solo album of new material, On My Way to Houston, Tompkins Square TSQ2233.

From 2006, Powell St. John was performing in live concerts backed by The Aliens, the band who had previously backed Roky Erickson on recordings and performances.

Powell St. John died on August 22, 2021.

Discography

With Mother Earth
 Living with the Animals (1968), Mercury SR 61194 
 Make A Joyful Noise (1969), Mercury SR 61226

Solo
 Right Track Now (2006) 
 On My Way to Houston (2009), Tompkins Square TSQ2233
 Women Rule (2015)

References

External links
 Official Powell St. John Website
 Interview with Powell St John on Music Life Radio
 The Austin Chronicle: Article about Powell St John and the early years of his musical career

1940 births
2021 deaths
People from Houston
American male singer-songwriters
Mother Earth (American band) members
Singer-songwriters from Texas